This list of tallest buildings in Dalian ranks skyscrapers in Dalian, Liaoning, China by height. The tallest building in Dalian is currently the Eton Place Dalian Tower 1

Dalian is the sub-provincial city in the Liaoning Province. It is the second largest city in Northeast China, with 6.2 million population and more than 3 million urban population.

With 19 buildings taller than 200 m, Dalian is ranked the 10th best skyline in China and the 33rd in the World.

Tallest buildings
This lists ranks Dalian skyscrapers that stand at least 140 m (460 feet) tall, based on standard height measurement. This includes spires and architectural details but does not include antenna masts. Existing structures are included for ranking purposes based on present height. All the structures in this list has been topped, but some may not be ready to use.

Tallest under construction, approved, and proposed

Under construction
This lists buildings that are under construction in Dalian and are planned to rise at least 140 m (328 feet). Buildings that have already been topped out are not included.

Proposed
This lists buildings that are Proposed in Dalian and are planned to rise at least 140 m (328 feet).

References

External links
 Dalian Skycraper on Skycraperpage.com 
 The World's best Skyline
 Dalian Skycrapers in Emporis.com
 Skyscrapers of Dalian on Gaoloumi (in Chinese)

Dalian
Skyscrapers in Dalian
Buildings and structures in Dalian